"A Sleep and a Forgetting" is a short story by Orson Scott Card. It only appears in his short story collection Capitol.

Plot summary
This story is about the early research done on the fictional drug Somec.  After some preliminary research had been done on Somec it was used to put a number of cancer patients into suspended animation.  Afterwards it was discovered that in addition to putting people to sleep Somec also erased their entire memory. Doctors tried to treat this condition by implanting false memories recorded from other people into the patients, but this met with limited success - the drug had not altered the patient's personality, and they had great difficulty in accepting that they would have performed many of the actions that they now remembered as theirs. When the scientist in charge of the project taped his own memories and then injected himself with Somec it was proved that a person could be revived from suspended animation if that person's own memories were recorded and then played back into the empty mind.

Connection to the Worthing Saga
This book uses several plot elements also used in The Worthing Saga, such as the sleeping drug Somec and the taping of memories.  The story can be considered the earliest (in story timeline) prequel to The Worthing Saga.  It takes place on Earth and is followed chronologically by the story "A Thousand Deaths".

See also

List of works by Orson Scott Card
Orson Scott Card

External links
 The official Orson Scott Card website

1979 short stories
Short stories by Orson Scott Card